Paambadam is an earring worn by elderly women in South Indian States such as Tamil Nadu & Kerala.

Designed in the shape of a snake hood, with two balls, two knobs, a square piece, and a tongue pieced together, the gold-coated earrings weigh about 50 g each.

Paambadam in Tamil means the hood of the snake(paambin padam).

The sheer weight of a paambadam enlarges the ear lobe, which has to be pierced with a special knife for gradual expression.

Paambadam would be worn with one or two others of similar size and weight, pulling down and stretching the earlobe considerably. The remarkable semi-abstract design actually incorporates animal forms, showing the head of a snake.

Currently, due to more modernisation, such earrings are not worn.

See also
Fashion in India

References

External links
 http://www.asianart.com/articles/ganguly/index.html

Jewellery of India
Tamil culture
Culture of Kerala